The following historic places in Northern Alberta are entered on the Canadian Register of Historic Places, whether they are federal, provincial, or municipal:

References

Northern Alberta